Galium pilosum, the hairy bedstraw, is a species of plants in the  Rubiaceae. It is native to the southern and eastern United States and Canada from Texas to Florida north to Kansas, Michigan, Ontario, Quebec and New Hampshire. There are also isolated populations in Arizona, New Mexico, Colorado and Hispaniola. The plant is classified as a noxious weed in New York, Pennsylvania, Massachusetts and Connecticut.

References

External links
Photo of herbarium specimen at Missouri Botanical Garden, collected in Missouri, Galium pilosum
USDA Plants profile
Go Botany, New England Wildflower Society, hairy bedstraw
Herbarium of the University of Michigan, Galium pilosum
Missouri Plants, Galium pilosum
University of Massachusetts at Amherst, Galium pilosum
Jeffrey S. Pippen, North Carolina Wildflowers, Galium pilosum

pilosum
Flora of Quebec
Flora of Ontario
Flora of the United States
Flora of Haiti
Flora of New York (state)
Flora of Pennsylvania
Flora of Massachusetts
Flora of Connecticut
Flora of the Dominican Republic
Plants described in 1789
Flora without expected TNC conservation status